This is a list of notable Odd Fellows buildings, sometimes called "Odd Fellows Hall", "Independent Order of Odd Fellows Building", "IOOF Building", "Odd Fellows Lodge" and variations. Also included is a List of Odd Fellows cemeteries, some of which include contributing buildings.

There are many hundreds of Odd Fellows associated buildings;  this list only aims to feature the most significant ones architecturally or otherwise.  For the part of the United States, it is intended to cover all that have been documented in the National Register of Historic Places or similar historic registry.

Several of the listed buildings are retirement homes.

There is a building in Three Oaks, Michigan. The engraved granite marker reads:

Three Oaks
1909
IOOF
Lodge 44

Australia
(ordered by state then city or town)

Canada

 IOOF Hall (Toronto), Ontario, at 
 Odd Fellows Temple (Saskatoon)

Denmark

Finland

New Zealand

Sweden

United States
(ordered by state then city)

Cemeteries

References

External links
 Photos of Odd Fellows Lodges in California, photographs taken and collected by sewkind in Panoramio.Com